Jefferson Van Horne (December 12, 1802 – September 28, 1857) was an American infantry officer. He was a veteran of the Seminole Wars, the Military Occupation of Texas, and the Mexican–American War.  He is best known as the "Founder of Fort Bliss".

Biography
Jefferson Van Horne was born in Bucks County, Pennsylvania in 1802 to Isaac Van Horne. His family moved to Zanesville, Ohio in 1810. Jefferson Van Horne was a cadet at the United States Military Academy at West Point from July 1, 1823 to July 1, 1827.

Early military career
Van Horne graduated from the United States Military Academy with a rank of thirteen in a class of thirty-eight. Upon graduation he was promoted to second lieutenant and assigned to the Third Infantry. As a second lieutenant he was on frontier duty at Jefferson Barracks Military Post, Missouri from 1827 to 1829; at Fort Leavenworth, Kansas in 1829; Jefferson Barracks Military Post, Missouri from 1829 to 1930; Natchitoches, Louisiana from 1830 to 1831, Fort Towson, Territory from 1831 to 1832 on Commissary duty; and transferring and subsisting Indians from 1832 to 1839. During this tour Van Horne was promoted to first lieutenant on April 1, 1836.

Van Horne fought in the Seminole Wars from 1840 to 1842, was promoted to captain on December 1, 1840, then stayed in garrison at Fort Stansbury, Florida from 1842 to 1843. He returned to Jefferson Barracks Military Post, Missouri in 1843. Van Horne took a sick leave of absence from 1843 to 1844. He returned to frontier duty at Fort Jesup, Louisiana, from 1844 to 1845. He participated in the Military Occupation of Texas in 1845 and 1846, and served on the recruiting service from 1846 to 1847.

Van Horne arrived in San Elizario Presidio on September 1, 1849, spending several days inspecting the fortifications of the presidio. He left San Elizario on September 4, stopping in Socorro and Ysleta on September 6, and finally arrived in El Paso on September 8, 1849.

Personal life
Van Horne married Mary S. Gilbert in Zanesville, Ohio on November 28, 1854.

See also

 Fort Bliss
 Isaac Van Horne, Jefferson Van Horne's father
 El Paso, Texas

References

1802 births
1857 deaths
United States Army officers
People from Zanesville, Ohio
American military personnel of the Mexican–American War
Sons of the American Revolution
United States Military Academy alumni
Military personnel from Ohio
People from Bucks County, Pennsylvania
Military personnel from Pennsylvania